Shiloh Hill is an unincorporated community in Randolph County, Illinois, United States.

History
Shiloh Hill was originally called Steuben, and under the latter name was platted in 1856.

References

Unincorporated communities in Randolph County, Illinois
Unincorporated communities in Illinois